Visitors to Eritrea must obtain a visa from one of the Eritrean diplomatic missions, unless they come from one of the visa exempt countries or countries eligible for visa on arrival.

Visa policy map

Visa exemption

Visa not required for minors under 18 years of age if accompanied by parents holding a national ID card issued by Eritrea.

Visa on arrival
Citizens of the following countries may obtain a visa on arrival for Eritrea:

Holders of a confirmation of a pre-arranged visa can obtain a visa on arrival, provided the sponsor in Eritrea submits a request to the Eritrean Immigration Authority 48 hours prior to arrival.

Transit 
Passengers with a confirmed onward ticket for a flight to a third country within 6 hours and cannot leave the airport. They must have documents required for the next destination.

See also

Visa requirements for Eritrean citizens

References 

Eritrea
Foreign relations of Eritrea